The 18th Saturn Awards, honoring the best in science fiction, fantasy and horror film and television in 1991, were held on March 13, 1992.

Winners and nominees
Below is a complete list of nominees and winners. Winners are highlighted in bold.

Film

Television

Video

Special awards
George Pal Memorial Award
 Gene Roddenberry

Life Career Award
 Arnold Schwarzenegger

President's Award
 Robert Shaye

Special Award
 Ray Harryhausen

References

External links
 Official Website

Saturn Awards ceremonies
1992 film awards
1992 television awards